Budde is a surname of Scandinavian origin. Notable people with the surname include:

Brad Budde (b. 1958), American professional football player
Christoph Budde (1963–2009), German professional football player
Ed Budde (b. 1940), American professional football player
Gustav Henrik Andreas Budde-Lund (1846–1911), Danish zoologist
Jonas Budde (1644–1710), Danish-Norwegian army officer
Jöns Budde (c. 1435–1495), Finnish Franciscan friar
Kai Budde (b. 1979), German professional Magic: The Gathering player
Karl Budde (1850–1935), German theologian
Katrin Budde (b. 1965), German politician
Mariann Budde (b. 1959), diocesan bishop of the Episcopal Diocese of Washington, D.C.
Robert Budde (b. 1966), Canadian poet, novelist, and professor
Ryan Budde (b. 1979), American professional baseball player
Theo Budde (1889–1959), Dutch jeweller, preservationist, and poet
Vincens Budde (1660–1729), Norwegian army officer